Enkoor is a mandal in Khammam district of Telangana, India. As per 2011 Census, it has a total population of 33,151.

Enkoor consists of 42 Villages and 25 Panchayats. Medepalle is the least populous village, and Enkuru is the most populous Village.

Literacy
As per the 2011 Census, 44.1% of the population in Enkoor is literate.

Villages
Villages in Enkoor, Andal are:
 Akkinapuram Thanda
 Arikayalapadu
 Bhagvan naik tanda
 Burda Raghavapuram
 Enkuru
 Garlavoddu
 Himam nagar
 Jannaram
 Kesupally
 Madineni Nagar
 Medepalle
 Munya thanda
 Nacharam
 Nukulampadu
 Raimadaram
 Rajulapalem
 Ramathanda
 Sree ramagiri
 Thimmaraopeta
 Thuthaka Lingampeta
 Yerrabodu thanda

Schools
Schools in Enkoor are:
 Telngana Residential School, Enkoor
 High School, Enkoor

References

Mandals in Khammam district